Tsagaannuur (white lake) is a sum (district) of Selenge Province in northern Mongolia. In 2008, its population was 4,257.

References 

Populated places in Mongolia
Districts of Selenge Province